Kim Yong-chun (4 March 1936 – 16 August 2018) was a North Korean soldier and politician. He was a leader of the North Korean military. He held the North Korean military rank Chasu (Vice Marshal), was Vice Chairman of the National Defense Commission of North Korea, and was Minister of People's Armed Forces (roughly corresponds to Minister of Defence in other countries). He held a minor post within the Workers Party.

Early life
Born in 1936 in Yanggang Province, he attended the Mangyongdae Revolutionary School and the Kim Il-sung Military University before starting his career in the party apparatus and the Korean People's Army.

Career
He served as secretary of the South Pyongyang Provincial Committee of the Workers' Party of Korea in the 1960s and was elected alternate member of the WPK Central Committee in 1980 at the 6th Party Congress. In 1986 he was elevated to Central Committee full member, director of the KPA General Staff Operations Bureau and deputy to the Supreme People's Assembly. He was abruptly purged in 1988 along with Chief of General Staff O Kuk-ryol for disputes with O Jin-u.

Kim Yong-chun reappeared in the 1990s as he was promoted to general and director of the General Munitions Mobilization Bureau. He also oversaw the disbandment of the North Hamgyong Province's Sixth Army Corps, accused of corruption. In 1995, after O Jin-u's death, he was promoted to Vice Marshal and Chief of the KPA General Staff, a post he held until 2007, when he was appointed a vice-chairman of the National Defence Commission.

Kim Yong-chun was reputedly close to Kim Jong-il and a member of his court of aides. He received new promotions in 2009 as Minister of People's Armed Forces and in 2010 as member of the Politburo and the Central Military Commission.

In December 2011, after the leader's death, he was ranked 5th among members of the Kim Jong-il funeral committee, immediately after Kim Jong-un and the Politburo Presidium members (Kim Yong-nam, Choe Yong-rim and Ri Yong-ho), signalling his powerful position in the new leadership.

He was replaced as Minister by Kim Jong-gak and appointed director of the WPK Civil Defense Department in April 2012. Although displaced from all significant leading posts, he was awarded the largely honorary rank of Marshal of the Korean People's Army in April 2016.

Death
Kim Yong-chun died on 16 August 2018 from myocardial infarction, aged 82. On his funeral committee were:

Kim Jong-un
Kim Yong-nam
Choe Ryong-hae
Pak Pong-ju
Ri Myong-su
Pak Kwang-ho
Ri Su-yong
Kim Phyong-hae
Thae Jong-su
O Su-yong
An Jong-su
Pak Thae-song
Kim Yong-chol
Ri Yong-ho
Choe Pu-il
Ro Tu-chol
Choe Hwi
Pak Thae-dok
Kim Su-gil
Ri Yong-gil
No Kwang-chol
Jong Kyong-thaek
Im Chol-ung
Jo Yon-jun
Ri Man-gon
Ri Pyong-chol
Kim Nung-o
Kim Tok-hun
Ri Ju-o
Ri Ryong-nam
Tong Jong-ho
Jon Kwang-ho
Ko In-ho
Kim Yong-dae
Ri Il-hwan
Ri Chol-man
Choe Tong-myong
Ri Yong-rae
Kim Kyong-ok
Hwang Pyong-so
Hong Sung-mu
Kim Jong-gak
Park Su-il
Hong Chan
Jang Kil-song
Son Chol-ju
Jo Kyong-chol
Ri Tu-song
Ho Yong-chun
Rim Un-guk
Yun Tong-hyon
Kim Jong-gwan
Ri Song-guk
Kim Hyong-ryong
Kang Su-nam
Kim Thaek-gu
Ri Tong-chun
Jong Yong-hak
Kim Sang-gap
Kim Song-chol
O Kum-chol
Pang Kwang-bok
Yun Pyong-gwon
An Ji-yong
Kim Myong-gyun
Pak Jong-chon
Jang Tong-un
Kwon Yong-jin
Kim Song-gi
Kim Chun-sik
Kim Yong-h
Kim Myong-sik
Kim Kwang-hyok
Pang Tu-sop
Pak Kwang-ju
Kim Myong-nam
Kim Yong-bok
Choe Tu-yong
Ri Thae-sop
Pak Myong-su
Kim Sang-ryong
Kim Kum-chol
Ri Bong-chun
Song Sok-won
Ju Song-nam
Song Yong-gon
Ri Jong-nam
Ko Myong-su
Kim Kwang-su
Ri Kwang-ho
Hong Jong-duk
Ri Yong-chol
Kim Kwang-hyok
Kim Chang-guk
So Sang-won
Kim Kuk-chang
Ju Tong-chol
Ri Yong-chol
An Yong-sik
Kim To-un
Yu Rim-ho
Yun Hui-hwan
Sin Ki-chol
Kim Kyong-ryong
Han Pyo-sop
Jo Nam-jin
Han Myong-son
O Pyong-chol
Kim Jong-chol
Jong Chol-ho
Sim Thae-bong
Jong Tong-chol
Ko Won-nam
Ju Jae-uk
Kim Yong-chol
Kim Tong-chol
Chin Kwang-chol
Han Chang-sun
Cha Kyong-il
Im Kwang-ung
Ryo Chun-sok
Kim Ki-son
Choe Kyong-song
Kang Tong-yun
Kim Yun-sim
Jon Chang-bok
Jong Myong-do
Pak Jae-gyong
Son Jong-nam
Jon Thae-ryong
Ri Chang-hun
Jon Sun-chol
Kim Jong-gil
Kang Pong-chan
Kim Son-jin
Kim Tu-il
Mun Kyong-dok
Pak Yong-ho
Ryang Jong-hun
Kim Jae-ryong
Pak Jong-nam
Ri Hi-yong
Kim Song-il
Ri Sang-won
Kang Yang-mo
Sin Yong-chol
Pak Chol-min
Ju Yong-gil
Kim Chang-yop

Awards and honors 
A frame with Kim's awards and honors was displayed during his funeral, showing all the decorations he had received.

Two gold autographed wristwatches and one pocket watch featuring Kim Il Sung or Kim Jong Il's signature

Two silver autographed wristwatches featuring Kim Il Sung or Kim Jong Il's signature

 Hero of the Republic

 Order of Kim Il-sung, twice

 Order of Kim Jong Il

 Order of the National Flag First Class, eight times

 Order of Korean Labour, twice

 Commemorative Order "Anniversary of the Foundation of the People's Army", twice

 Commemorative Order "20th Anniversary of the Foundation of the Democratic People's Republic of Korea", twice

 Commemorative Order "Foundation of the Democratic People's Republic of Korea", twice

 Order of the National Flag Second Class, twice

 Order of Freedom and Independence Second Class

 Commemorative Order "50th Anniversary of the Foundation of the Democratic People's Republic of Korea", twice

 Order of the Red Banner of Three Great Revolutions

 Commemorative Order "40th Anniversary of Fatherland Liberation War Victory"

 Order of the National Flag Third Class, three times

 Medal For Military Merit, twice

 Commemorative Medal "Fatherland Liberation"

 Commemorative Medal "The Foundation of the People's Republic of Korea", twice

References

|-

1936 births
2018 deaths
North Korean military personnel
Defence ministers of North Korea
People from Ryanggang
Members of the 6th Politburo of the Workers' Party of Korea
Members of the 6th Central Committee of the Workers' Party of Korea